Agent Storm may refer to:

Agent Storm: My Life Inside al-Qaeda
J. W. Storm